The Atacama Desert is a desert plateau in South America covering a 1,600 km (990 mi) strip of land on the Pacific coast, west of the Andes Mountains. The Atacama Desert is the driest nonpolar desert in the world, and the second driest overall, just behind some very specific spots within the McMurdo Dry Valleys as well as the only hot true desert to receive less precipitation than the polar deserts, and the largest fog desert in the world. Both regions have been used as experimentation sites on Earth for Mars expedition simulations. The Atacama Desert occupies , or  if the barren lower slopes of the Andes are included. Most of the desert is composed of stony terrain, salt lakes (salares), sand, and felsic lava that flows towards the Andes.

The desert owes its extreme aridity to a constant temperature inversion due to the cool north-flowing Humboldt ocean current and to the presence of the strong Pacific anticyclone. The most arid region of the Atacama Desert is situated between two mountain chains (the Andes and the Chilean Coast Range) of sufficient height to prevent moisture advection from either the Pacific or the Atlantic Ocean, a two-sided rain shadow.

Despite modern views of the Atacama Desert as fully devoid of vegetation, in pre-Columbian and colonial times a large flatland area there known as Pampa del Tamarugal was a woodland, but demand for firewood associated with silver and saltpeter mining in the 18th and 19th centuries resulted in widespread deforestation.

Setting 
 
According to the World Wide Fund for Nature, the Atacama Desert ecoregion occupies a continuous strip for nearly 1,600 km (1,000 mi) along the narrow coast of the northern third of Chile, from near Arica (18°24′S) southward to near La Serena (29°55′S). The National Geographic Society considers the coastal area of southern Peru to be part of the Atacama Desert and includes the deserts south of the Ica Region in Peru. However, other sources consider that the part of the desert in Peru is a different ecosystem, and should properly be named as Pampas de la Joya desert.

Peru borders it on the north and the Chilean Matorral ecoregion borders it on the south. To the east lies the less arid Central Andean dry puna ecoregion. The drier portion of this ecoregion is located south of the Loa River between the parallel Sierra Vicuña Mackenna and Cordillera Domeyko. To the north of the Loa lies the Pampa del Tamarugal.

The Coastal Cliff of northern Chile west of the Chilean Coast Range is the main topographical feature of the coast. The geomorphology of the Atacama Desert has been characterized as a low-relief bench "similar to a giant uplifted terrace" by Armijo and co-workers. The intermediate depression (or Central Valley) forms a series of endorheic basins in much of the Atacama Desert south of latitude 19°30'S. North of this latitude, the intermediate depression drains into the Pacific Ocean.

Climate

The almost total lack of precipitation is the most prominent characteristic of the Atacama Desert.

In 2012, the altiplano winter brought floods to San Pedro de Atacama.

On 25 March 2015, heavy rainfall affected the southern part of the Atacama Desert. Resulting floods triggered mudflows that affected the cities of Copiapo, Tierra Amarilla, Chanaral, and Diego de Almagro, causing the deaths of more than 100 people.

Aridity 

The Atacama Desert is commonly known as the driest place in the world, especially the surroundings of the abandoned Yungay mining town, where the University of Antofagasta Desert Research Station is located, in Antofagasta Region, Chile. Moreover, some weather stations in the Atacama have never received rain. Periods up to four years have been registered with no rainfall in the central sector, delimited by the cities of Antofagasta, Calama, and Copiapó, in Chile. Evidence suggests that the Atacama may not have had any significant rainfall from 1570 to 1971.

The Atacama Desert may be the oldest desert on earth, and has experienced hyperaridity since at least the Middle Miocene, since the establishment of a proto-Humboldt current in conjunction with the opening of the Tasmania-Antarctic passage ca. 33 Ma. The opening of the Tasmania-Antarctic passage allowed for cold currents to move along the west coast of South America, which influenced the availability of warm humid air to travel from the Amazon Basin to the Atacama. Though there was a general lack of humid air after 33 Ma, there were punctuated intervals of increased humidity, such as between around 10.86 and 6.4 Ma, when the Tiliviche Palaeolake existed before turning into a salar sometime before the Middle Pliocene. The long history of aridity raises the possibility that supergene mineralisation, under the appropriate conditions, can form in arid environments, instead of requiring humid conditions. The presence of evaporite formations suggest that in some sections of the Atacama Desert, arid conditions have persisted for the last 200 million years (since the Triassic).

Only the highest peaks (such as Ojos del Salado, Monte Pissis, and Llullaillaco) have some permanent snow coverage.

Studies by a group of British scientists have suggested that some river beds have been dry for 120,000 years. However, some locations in the Atacama receive a marine fog known locally as the camanchaca, providing sufficient moisture for hypolithic algae, lichens, and even some cacti—the genus Copiapoa is notable among these.

Geographically, the aridity of the Atacama is explained by its being situated between two mountain chains (the Andes and the Chilean Coast Range) of sufficient height to prevent moisture advection from either the Pacific or the Atlantic Oceans, a two-sided rain shadow.

In June 1991, Antofagasta and Taltal and inland regions as far as Calama received unusual rainfall leading to formation of a series of mudflows that killed 91 persons.

Comparison to Mars

Owing to its otherworldly appearance, the Atacama has been used as a location for filming Mars scenes, most notably in the television series Space Odyssey: Voyage to the Planets.

In 2003, a team of researchers published a report  in which they duplicated the tests used by the Viking 1 and Viking 2 Mars landers to detect life and were unable to detect any signs in Atacama Desert soil in the region of Yungay. The region may be unique on Earth in this regard and is being used by NASA to test instruments for future Mars missions. The team duplicated the Viking tests in Mars-like Earth environments and found that they missed present signs of life in soil samples from Antarctic dry valleys, the Atacama Desert of Chile and Peru, and other locales.
However, in 2014, a new hyperarid site was reported, María Elena South, which was much drier than Yungay and, thus, a better Mars-like environment.

In 2008, the Phoenix Mars Lander detected perchlorates on the surface of Mars at the same site where water was first discovered. Perchlorates are also found in the Atacama and associated nitrate deposits have contained organics, leading to speculation that signs of life on Mars are not incompatible with perchlorates. The Atacama is also a testing site for the NASA-funded Earth–Mars Cave Detection Program.

On 21 February 2023, scientists reported the findings of a "dark microbiome" of unfamiliar microorganisms in the Atacama Desert.

Flora

In spite of the geographic and climatic conditions of the desert, a rich variety of flora has evolved there. Over 500 species have been gathered within the border of this desert. These species are characterized by their extraordinary ability to adapt to this extreme environment. The most common species are herbs and flowers such as thyme, llareta, and saltgrass (Distichlis spicata), and where humidity is sufficient, trees such as the chañar (Geoffroea decorticans), the pimiento tree, and the leafy algarrobo (Prosopis chilensis).

The llareta is one of the highest-growing wood species in the world. It concentrates and retains the heat from the day to cope with low evening temperatures. It produces a much-prized resin, which the mining industry once harvested indiscriminately as fuel, making this plant endangered.

The desert is also home to cacti, succulents, and other plants that thrive in a dry climate.

The Atacama Desert flowering (Spanish: desierto florido) can be seen from September to November in years with sufficient precipitation, as happened in 2015.

Fauna

The climate of the Atacama Desert limits the number of animals living permanently in this extreme ecosystem. Some parts of the desert are so arid, no plant or animal life can survive. Outside of these extreme areas, sand-colored grasshoppers blend with pebbles on the desert floor, and beetles and their larvae provide a valuable food source in the lomas (hills). Desert wasps and butterflies can be found during the warm and humid season, especially on the lomas. Red scorpions also live in the desert.

A unique environment is provided by some lomas, where the fog from the ocean provides enough moisture for seasonal plants and a few animal species. Surprisingly few reptile species inhabit the desert and even fewer amphibian species. Chaunus atacamensis, the Vallenar toad or Atacama toad, lives on the lomas, where it lays eggs in permanent ponds or streams. Iguanians and lava lizards inhabit parts of the desert, while salt flat lizards, Liolaemus, live in the dry areas bordering the ocean. One species, Liolaemus fabiani, is endemic to the Salar de Atacama, the Atacama salt flat.

Birds are one of the most diverse animal groups in the Atacama. Humboldt penguins live year-round along the coast, nesting in desert cliffs overlooking the ocean. Inland, high-altitude salt flats are inhabited by Andean flamingos, while Chilean flamingos can be seen along the coast. Other birds (including species of hummingbirds and rufous-collared sparrow) visit the lomas seasonally to feed on insects, nectar, seeds, and flowers. The lomas help sustain several threatened species, such as the endangered Chilean woodstar.

Because of the desert's extreme aridity, only a few specially adapted mammal species live in the Atacama, such as Darwin's leaf-eared mouse. The less arid parts of the desert are inhabited by the South American gray fox and the viscacha (a relative of the chinchilla). Larger animals, such as guanacos and vicuñas, graze in areas where grass grows, mainly because it is seasonally irrigated by melted snow. Vicuñas need to remain near a steady water supply, while guanacos can roam into more arid areas and survive longer without fresh water. South American fur seals and South American sea lions often gather along the coast.

Human presence 

The Atacama is sparsely populated, with most towns located along the Pacific coast. In interior areas, oases and some valleys have been populated for millennia and were the location of the most advanced pre-Columbian societies found in Chile.

Chinchorro culture

The Chinchorro culture developed in the Atacama Desert area from 7000 BCE to 1500 BCE. These peoples were sedentary fishermen inhabiting mostly coastal areas. Their presence is found from today's towns of Ilo, in southern Peru, to Antofagasta in northern Chile. Presence of fresh water in the arid region on the coast facilitated human settlement in these areas. The Chinchorro were famous for their detailed mummification and funerary practices.

Inca and Spanish empires
San Pedro de Atacama, at about  elevation, is like many of the small towns. Before the Inca Empire and prior to the arrival of the Spanish, the extremely arid interior was inhabited primarily by the Atacameño tribe. They are noted for building fortified towns called pucarás, one of which is located a few kilometers from San Pedro de Atacama. The town's church was built by the Spanish in 1577.

The oasis settlement of Pica has Pre-hispanic origins and served as an important stopover for transit between the coast and the Altiplano during the time of the Inca Empire.

The coastal cities originated in the 16th, 17th, and 18th centuries during the time of the Spanish Empire, when they emerged as shipping ports for silver produced in Potosí and other mining centers.

Republican period

During the 19th century, the desert came under control of Bolivia, Chile, and Peru. With the discovery of sodium nitrate deposits and as a result of unclear borders, the area soon became a zone of conflict and resulted in the War of the Pacific. Chile annexed most of the desert, and cities along the coast developed into international ports, hosting many Chilean workers who migrated there.

With the guano and saltpeter booms of the 19th century, the population grew immensely, mostly as a result of immigration from central Chile. In the 20th century, the nitrate industry declined and at the same time, the largely male population of the desert became increasingly problematic for the Chilean state. Miners and mining companies came into conflict, and protests spread throughout the region.

Around 1900, there were  irrigation system of puquios spread through the oases of Atacama Desert. Puquios are known from the valleys of Azapa and Sibaya and the oases of La Calera, Pica-Matilla and Puquio de Núñez. In 1918, geologist Juan Brüggen mentioned the existence of 23 socavones (shafts) in the Pica oasis, yet these have since been abandoned due to economic and social changes.

Abandoned nitrate mining towns 

The desert has rich deposits of copper and other minerals and the world's largest natural supply of sodium nitrate (Chile saltpeter), which was mined on a large scale until the early 1940s. The Atacama border dispute over these resources between Chile and Bolivia began in the 19th century and resulted in the War of the Pacific.

The desert is littered with about 170 abandoned nitrate (or "saltpeter") mining towns, almost all of which were shut down decades after the invention of synthetic nitrate in Germany in the first decade of the 20th century (see Haber process). The towns include Chacabuco, Humberstone, Santa Laura, Pedro de Valdivia, Puelma, María Elena, and Oficina Anita.

The Atacama Desert is rich in metallic mineral resources such as copper, gold, silver and iron, as well as nonmetallic minerals including important deposits of boron, lithium, sodium nitrate, and potassium salts. The Salar de Atacama is where bischofite is extracted. These resources are exploited by various mining companies such as Codelco, Lomas Bayas, Mantos Blancos, and Soquimich.

Astronomical observatories 

Because of its high altitude, nearly nonexistent cloud cover, dry air, and freedom from light pollution and radio interference from widely populated cities and towns, this desert is one of the best places in the world to conduct astronomical observations. Hundreds of thousands of stars can be viewed via telescope since the desert experiences more than 200 cloudless nights each year. A number of telescopes have been installed to help astronomers from across the globe study the universe. A radio astronomy telescope, called the Atacama Large Millimeter Array, built by European countries, Japan, the United States, Canada, and Chile in the Llano de Chajnantor Observatory officially opened on 3 October 2011. A number of radio astronomy projects, such as the CBI, the ASTE and the ACT, among others, have been operating in the Chajnantor area since 1999. On 26 April 2010, the ESO council decided to build a fourth site, Cerro Armazones, to be home to the Extremely Large Telescope. Construction work at the ELT site started in June 2014.

The European Southern Observatory operates three major observatories in the Atacama and is currently building a fourth:
 La Silla Observatory
 Paranal Observatory, which includes the Very Large Telescope (VLT)
 Llano de Chajnantor Observatory, which hosts the ALMA international radio observatory
 Cerro Armazones Observatory, site of the future Extremely Large Telescope (ELT)

Other uses

Sports

The Atacama Desert is popular with all-terrain sports enthusiasts. Various championships have taken place here, including the Lower Atacama Rally, Lower Chile Rally, Patagonia-Atacama Rally, and the latter Dakar Rally's editions. The rally was organized by the Amaury Sport Organisation and held in 2009, 2010, 2011, and 2012. The dunes of the desert are ideal rally races located in the outskirts of the city of Copiapó. The 2013 Dakar 15-Day Rally started on 5 January in Lima, Peru, through Chile, Argentina and back to Chile finishing in Santiago. Visitors also use the Atacama Desert sand dunes for sandboarding (Spanish: duna).

A week-long foot race called the Atacama Crossing has the competitors cross the various landscapes of the Atacama.

An event called Volcano Marathon takes place near the Lascar volcano in the Atacama Desert.

Solar car racing
Eighteen solar powered cars were displayed in front of the presidential palace (La Moneda) in Santiago in November 2012. The cars were then raced  through the desert from 15–19 November 2012.

Tourism
Most people who go to tour the sites in the desert stay in the town of San Pedro de Atacama. The Atacama Desert is in the top three tourist locations in Chile. The specially commissioned ESO hotel is reserved for astronomers and scientists.

El Tatio Geyser

About 80 geysers occur in a valley about 80 km from the town of San Pedro de Atacama. They are closer to the town of Chiu Chiu.

Termas Baños de Puritama

Gallery

Protected areas 
 Pan de Azúcar National Park
 Pampa del Tamarugal National Reserve
 La Chimba National Reserve

Legends 
 Alicanto
 Atacama Giant

See also 

 2010 Copiapó mining accident
 Atacama Desert border dispute
 Camanchaca
 List of deserts by area
 Lomas
 Llano de Chajnantor Observatory
 Mano del Desierto
 Norte Grande
 Paposo
 Pulperia
 Puna de Atacama
 Salar de Atacama
 Transverse Valleys
 The asteroid 18725 Atacama has been named after the Atacama Desert.

Notes

References

Bibliography

External links 

 "Mars-like Soils in the Atacama Desert, Chile, and the Dry Limit of Microbial Life", NASA press release
 "Roving robot finds desert life", article in Nature
 "A Lady in the Atacama Desert", from the travel blog A Lady in London
 Detailed article issued by the Geological Society of America on the history of aridity of the Atacama Desert
 Atacama Desert Photo Gallery, photos of many different landscapes, flora and fauna of the Atacama Desert
TECHNICAL SPECIFICATIONS of the E-ELT (acronym for European Extremely Large Telescope)

 
Deserts and xeric shrublands
Ecoregions of Chile
Dunes of South America
Ergs
Geography of Atacama Region
Plateaus of Chile
Landforms of Atacama Region
Natural regions of South America
Regions of Chile
Physiographic sections
Neotropical ecoregions